Monroe Township is a township in Wyoming County, Pennsylvania, United States. The population was 1,665 at the 2020 census.

Geography

Demographics

As of the census of 2010, there were 1,652 people, 674 households, and 466 families residing in the township.  The population density was 77.9 people per square mile (30.1/km2).  There were 732 housing units at an average density of 34.5/sq mi (13.5/km2).  The racial makeup of the township was 98.4% White, 0.7% African American, 0.2% Asian, 0.05% from other races, and 0.65% from two or more races. Hispanic or Latino of any race were 1% of the population.

There were 674 households, out of which 28.2% had children under the age of 18 living with them, 51.6% were married couples living together, 11.3% had a female householder with no husband present, and 30.9% were non-families. while 25.2% of all households were made up of individuals, and 8.4% had someone living alone who was 65 years of age or older.  The average household size was 2.45 and the average family size was 2.86.

In the township the population was spread out, with 20.4% under the age of 18, 63.7% from 18 to 64, and 15.9% who were 65 years of age or older.  The median age was 43 years.

The median income for a household in the township was $43,625, and the median income for a family was $50,263. Males had a median income of $43,482 versus $30,236 for females. The per capita income for the township was $23,421.  About 6.4% of families and 9% of the population were below the poverty line, including 12.8% of those under age 18 and 12.3% of those age 65 or over.

References

Townships in Wyoming County, Pennsylvania
Townships in Pennsylvania